La Première Internationale en Espagne (1868–1888) is a history book on the Spanish First International. Written by historian Max Nettlau in French, Renée Lamberet edited and verified the posthumous manuscript for publication by D. Reidel in 1969.

References

Bibliography 

 
 
 
 
 
 
 

1969 non-fiction books
French-language books
History books about anarchism
International Workingmen's Association